La Biche River Airport  is located near La Biche River, Yukon, Canada. It receives limited maintenance and prior permission is required to land.

References

Registered aerodromes in Yukon